The DBAG Class 612 is a two car, tilting, diesel multiple unit operated by the Deutsche Bahn for fast regional rail services on unelectrified lines.

General information

The Class are a two car tilting DMU built between 1998 and 2003 by Adtranz in Hennigsdorf which later became Bombardier Transportation. The class are also known as RegioSwingers.

They were developed to replace the problematic DB Class 611. The sets worked fine between 1998 and 2004 until cracks were detected in a number of wheelsets and so the tilting system was disabled and curves on lines had to have reduced speed limits, which affected the timetables and connections. From 2005 the trains had the wheelsets replaced and the tilting system was back up and running. The maximum tilt is 8°.

After ICE TD class 605 was grounded due to a fracture of an axle in one unit, it was replaced by class 612 on the Dresden-Munich line 2003, as replacement by anything other than a tilting DMU would have meant an extension of travel time. Even though class 612 was not constructed for ICE-type travelling comfort, 16 units were repainted in the ICE paint scheme and renumbered as class 612.4.

The RegioSwinger design is also used by Croatian Railways as class HŽ 7123.

Liveries

Most units are in the standard Verkehrsrot Red livery. In 2003 17 units were painted in the ICE scheme of White with a red band, however, these are now back in all red.

After 2017, trains using the yellow/white/black branding of bwegt, the mobility brand of the Baden-Württemberg State Ministry for Transport have been operating out of Ulm.

Services
Class 612 are used on the following services in the different regions (2012):

DB Regio Bayern

 IRE 1 Nürnberg - Bayreuth - Hof - Plauen - Zwickau - Chemnitz – Dresden
 RE Hof/Bayreuth – Lichtenfels – Saalfeld
 RE Hof – Bamberg
 RE Hof – Würzburg
 RE Hof – Nürnberg
 RB Lichtenfels – Kronach
 RE Regensburg – Schwandorf – Weiden –  Marktredwitz – Hof
 RE Würzburg – Bamberg – Hof/Bayreuth
 RE Nürnberg – Schwandorf/Weiden
 RB Würzburg – Schweinfurt – Ebenhausen – Bad Kissingen
 RE Nürnberg – Donauwörth – Augsburg – Buchloe – Kempten – Immenstadt – Lindau/Oberstdorf (called "Allgäu-Franken-Express")
 RE Lindau – Immenstadt – Kempten – Memmingen – Ulm
 RE Oberstdorf – Immenstadt – Kempten – Memmingen – Ulm
 RE Lindau - Kempten - Augsburg

DB Regio Nordrhein-Westfalen

 RE 17 Hagen – Schwerte (Ruhr) – Fröndenberg – Arnsberg (Westf) – Meschede – Bestwig – Brilon-Wald – Marsberg – Warburg (Westf) – Hofgeismar – Grebenstein – Kassel Hbf – Kassel-Wilhelmshöhe

DB Regio Rhein Neckar

 RE 4 Karlsruhe – Graben-Neudorf – Germersheim – Speyer – Ludwigshafen – Worms – Mainz

DB Regio Südwest 

 RE 3 Frankfurt (Main) Hbf – Mainz – Bad Kreuznach – Kirn – Idar-Oberstein – Türkismühle – Saarbrücken
 RE 11 Saarbrücken - Saarlouis - Merzig - Trier
 RE 12 Trier – Bitburg – Gerolstein – Kall – Euskirchen – Köln
 RE 25 Koblenz Hbf – Limburg (Lahn) – Wetzlar – Gießen
 IRE Stuttgart Hbf — Tübingen Hbf — Sigmaringen( — Aulendorf)/ — Rottenburg( — Horb)(Stuttgart Hbf — Tübingen Hbf only calling at Reutlingen Hbf)

DB Regio Südost 

 RE 4 Hannover Hbf – Hildesheim – Goslar – Bad Harzburg – Halberstadt – Halle (Saale) (– Leipzig)
 RE 6 Leipzig – Chemnitz
 RE 16 Leipzig – Altenburg – Reichenbach (V.) – Hof/Adorf
 RE 1 Dresden – Bischofswerda – Görlitz
 RE 2 Dresden – Bischofswerda – Zittau – Liberec – Tanvald
 RE 3 Nürnberg – Marktredwitz – Hof – Zwickau – Chemnitz – Dresden
 RE 1 Göttingen – Gotha – Erfurt – Gera – Gößnitz – Zwickau/Chemnitz
 RE 3 Erfurt – Gera – Altenburg
 RE 14 Erfurt – Meiningen
 RE 7 Würzburg – Suhl – Erfurt

References

Citations
 
 
 

Diesel multiple units of Germany
Tilting trains
Adtranz multiple units
Bombardier Transportation multiple units